Metasphecia is a genus of moths in the family Sesiidae containing only one species, Metasphecia vuilleti, which is known from Senegal.

References

Sesiidae
Moths described in 1917
Endemic fauna of Senegal
Insects of West Africa
Moths of Africa